Paul Hix (born 6 March 1974) is a British luger. He competed in the men's singles event at the 1994 Winter Olympics.

References

External links
 

1974 births
Living people
British male lugers
Olympic lugers of Great Britain
Lugers at the 1994 Winter Olympics
Place of birth missing (living people)